Garmabalah and Garmavaleh may refer to:

Garmabalah-ye Olya
Garmabalah-ye Sofla